The 1953 Illinois Fighting Illini football team was an American football team that represented the University of Illinois during the 1953 Big Ten Conference football season.  In their 12th year under head coach Ray Eliot, the Illini compiled a 7–1–1 record, finished in a tie for first place in the Big Ten Conference, and were ranked #7 in the final AP Poll. The sole defeat was a 34–7 loss to Wisconsin.

Tackle Don Ernst was selected as the team's most valuable player. Sophomore halfback J. C. Caroline led the team with 1,256 rushing yards on 194 attempts (6.5 yards per carry) and was selected as a consensus first-team player on the 1953 College Football All-America Team. Guard John Bauer was selected by the Newspaper Enterprise Association as a third-team All-American.

Schedule

Roster

Head Coach: Ray Eliot (12th year at Illinois)

References

Illinois
Illinois Fighting Illini football seasons
Big Ten Conference football champion seasons
College football undefeated seasons
Illinois Fighting Illini football